Edward Lansing Gordon Jr. (July 1, 1908 – September 5, 1971) was an American athlete, who competed mainly in the long jump.

He was born in Jackson, Mississippi, and died in Detroit, Michigan.

Gordon was a student-athlete and graduated from the University of Iowa.

At the 1928 Summer Olympics, he finished seventh in the long jump competition.

He competed for the United States in the 1932 Summer Olympics held in Los Angeles, United States, where he won the gold medal in the long jump.

His son Edward Lansing Gordon III is the current host of Our World with Black Enterprise and has worked for BET, CBS News, NBC News, and NPR.

External links

1908 births
1971 deaths
American male long jumpers
Athletes (track and field) at the 1928 Summer Olympics
Athletes (track and field) at the 1932 Summer Olympics
Olympic gold medalists for the United States in track and field
Track and field athletes from Detroit
Sportspeople from Jackson, Mississippi
Medalists at the 1932 Summer Olympics